Penelope Ann Bansall Jamieson  (née Allen; born 21 June 1942) is a retired Anglican bishop. She was the seventh Bishop of Dunedin in the Anglican Church of New Zealand from 1989 until her retirement in 2004. Jamieson was the second woman in the world, after Barbara Harris, to hold the position of bishop in the Anglican Communion and the first to be elected a diocesan bishop.

Early life
Born in Chalfont St Giles, Buckinghamshire, England, in 1942, Jamieson attended Wycombe High School and studied linguistics at the University of Edinburgh before moving to New Zealand, her husband's country of birth. She worked at the Wellington Inner City Mission while completing her doctoral thesis at Victoria University.

Ordained ministry
In 1982, she was ordained a deacon and then a priest in 1983. She was assistant curate of St James' Lower Hutt from 1982 to 1985. In 1985, she was vicar of Karori West with Mākara in the Diocese of Wellington.

In 1990 she was elected to head the country's southernmost diocese, the Diocese of Dunedin. She was consecrated a bishop on 29 June 1990. She spoke publicly about the difficulties of being the world's first woman diocesan bishop. For instance, her ordination as bishop was not attended by the Anglican Bishop of Aotearoa (Whakahuihui Vercoe) and the Catholic Bishop of Dunedin, (Leonard Boyle).

On 15 March 2004 she announced her retirement. At her retirement, after 14 years as Bishop of Dunedin, Jamieson expressed her regret that no other woman had been elected a bishop in New Zealand.

Personal life
She is married to Ian Jamieson.

In the 2004 Queen's Birthday Honours, Jamieson was appointed a Distinguished Companion of the New Zealand Order of Merit, for services to the community. In 2009, following the restoration of titular honours by the New Zealand government, she declined redesignation as a Dame Companion of the New Zealand Order of Merit.

References

Works 

 Living at the Edge: sacrament and solidarity in leadership, Jamieson, P. A. B London, Mowbray 1997

External links
Monumental Studies biography
New Zealand Herald article
New Zealand honours

1942 births
Living people
People from Chalfont St Giles
People educated at Wycombe High School
Alumni of the University of Edinburgh
English emigrants to New Zealand
Victoria University of Wellington alumni
Women Anglican bishops
20th-century Anglican bishops in New Zealand
21st-century Anglican bishops in New Zealand
Anglican bishops of Dunedin
Distinguished Companions of the New Zealand Order of Merit